The Lithuanian Road Museum is a museum in Lithuania that collects, displays and interprets objects related to road building. It is located in the premises of the state highway organisation, "", in Vievis, near the main road between Vilnius and Kaunas and opened on the 25th anniversary of the road's completion, on 19 October 1995.

The collection of approximately 6,000 objects includes models, tools, plant, protective clothing, road signs and documents.

The museum's founder, director and curator is Juozas Stepankevičius, a former road engineer and construction manager.

References

External links 

 Museums of Lithuania (English language page)

Museums in Lithuania
1995 establishments in Lithuania
Museums established in 1995